Sidney Culverwell Oland (17 June 1886, Dartmouth, Nova Scotia – 17 November 1977, Halifax, Nova Scotia) was an owner of Oland Brewery and philanthropist. He made significant contributions to the military, the arts and the cultural life of Nova Scotia. He commissioned the building of Bluenose II and donated it to Nova Scotia.  He also donated a fountain to Halifax in memory of his wife, which is located in Victoria Park, Halifax, Nova Scotia.

Sailing 

Oland's interest in sailing began with the purchase of a sloop-yacht named “Lady Betty” that he sailed in local races and fishing trips.  He later sailed his ninety-foot schooner “Nomad” and later the 70 foot motor cruiser called “Lady Betty 2.’

He became the Commodore of the Royal Nova Scotia Yacht Squadron.

He built the “Bluenose 2” in 1963 for $300 000 (2.4 million in 2018) and sold it to the province of Nova Scotia for $1.00.

Military 

During WW1, Oland commanded the 6th Battery at Fort McNab on McNabs Island.  He went to France and as Commander of the 66th Battery, C.F. A, the 144th Brigade, CFA and the 1st.   He fought in the Battle of Passchendaele in 1917 and the Battle of Amiens.  He was mentioned in the dispatches signed by Winston Churchill.

In 1937, he organized the Nova Scotia Division of the Canadian Corps of Commissionaires.  In 1965, he acquired and renovated the Black-Binney House to serve as the Headquarters for the Corps in Nova Scotia.

The Arts 

Between 1923-1925, while prohibition was enforced, Oland went to Hollywood, California, acting and directing silent films. He was friends with Lillian Gish, Mary Pickford, and Tallulah Bankhead. He played a small part in All Quiet on the Western Front (1930 film).  He would later become the founding director of The Theatre Arts Guild (1931).  He was instrumental in establishing Neptune Theatre (1963) in Halifax, Nova Scotia. He also was a director for the National Gallery of Canada in Ottawa.

Brewery 

He was educated in beer making at the United States Brewers’ Academy in New York.  Oland and his father purchased a brewery in Halifax in 1907 and named it Oland and Son Limited. The Brewery has located in Dartmouth and destroyed in the Halifax Explosion. Upon his father's death, Oland became the President of Oland and Son Limited (1933) and president of A. Keith and Son Limited, which they acquired in 1927.

References 

1886 births
1977 deaths
People from Dartmouth, Nova Scotia
Businesspeople from Nova Scotia
20th-century Canadian businesspeople